The second season of the television comedy series Mike & Molly began airing on September 26, 2011 on CBS in the United States. The season was produced by Chuck Lorre Productions and Warner Bros. Television, with series creator Mark Roberts serving as executive producer along with Chuck Lorre, James Burrows and Don Foster.

The series focuses on the title characters Mike Biggs (Billy Gardell) and Molly Flynn (Melissa McCarthy), a couple who meet at an Overeaters Anonymous meeting in Chicago, Illinois. After Molly, a primary-school teacher, invites police officer Mike to give a talk to her class, they begin dating. Molly lives at home with her mother Joyce (Swoosie Kurtz), and sister Victoria (Katy Mixon). Joyce is in an on-off relationship with widower Vince Moranto (Louis Mustillo), who is often seen at the house. Mike lives alone in an apartment but is regularly kept company by his best friend and partner in the police force Carl McMillan (Reno Wilson). Other prominent characters in the series include Carl's grandmother Rosetta (Cleo King), Mike's mother Peggy (Rondi Reed) and cafe worker Samuel (Nyambi Nyambi). Holly Robinson Peete has a recurring guest role in Season 2 as Carl's love interest. Season two of Mike & Molly was broadcast in the United States on Mondays at 9:30 pm.

On August 21, 2012 Warner Home Video released a three-disc set of the second season on DVD, which included every episode, a featurette, bloopers, and interviews with the cast.

Cast

Main
 Billy Gardell as Mike Biggs (23 episodes)
 Melissa McCarthy as Molly Flynn (23 episodes)
 Reno Wilson as Carl McMillan (23 episodes)
 Katy Mixon as Victoria Flynn (23 episodes)
 Nyambi Nyambi as Samuel (23 episodes)
 Rondi Reed as Peggy Biggs (13 episodes)
 Cleo King as Rosetta McMillan, "Nana" (8 episodes)
 Louis Mustillo as Vince Moranto (18 episodes)
 Swoosie Kurtz as Joyce Flynn (23 episodes)

Recurring and guest appearances
 Holly Robinson Peete as Christina
 David Anthony Higgins as Harry
 Reginald VelJohnson as Brother Heywood
 Francis Guinan as Jack Biggs
 William Sanderson as Dennis
 Steve Hytner as Principal Gilmartin
 Laura Coover as Rebecca
 Cheryl Hawker as Lynette
 Marianne Muellerleile as Connie
 Brendan Patrick Connor as George
 Howard Hesseman as Otis
 Josh Dean as Father Justin
 Lamont Thompson as Andre
 June Squibb as Francine
 Dave "Gruber" Allen as Tom
 Mark Roberts as Homeless Guy

Episodes

Ratings

References

External links
 Episode recaps at CBS.com
 List of Mike & Molly Season 2 episodes at Internet Movie Database

2011 American television seasons
2012 American television seasons
Mike & Molly
Television episodes directed by James Burrows